Pierre Dufal, C.S.C. (8 November 1822 – 14 March 1898) was a French-born bishop of the Catholic Church in Eastern Bengal and the United States. He served as the Vicar Apostolic of Eastern Bengal and as the Coadjutor Bishop of Galveston.  He was also the Superior General of the Congregation of Holy Cross.

Biography
Born in the village of Saint-Gervais-d'Auvergne, Puy-de-Dôme, France, Pierre Dufal professed final vows in the Congregation of Holy Cross on 20 January 1852 and ordained a priest on 29 September that year. On 3 July 1860 Pope Pius IX appointed him as the Titular Bishop of Delcus and Vicar Apostolic of Eastern Bengal. He was consecrated a bishop by Archbishop Joseph-Hippolyte Guibert of Paris on 25 November 1860.

The principal co-consecrators were Bishops Jean-Jacques Nanquette of Le Mans and Célestine Guynemer de la Hailandière of Vincennes, Indiana.

Dufal was assigned as the Superior General of Congregation of Holy Cross on 25 August 1866 and resigned the position two years later on 19 July. He participated in the First Vatican Council (1869-1870) as one of the council fathers. His resignation as the Vicar Apostolic of Eastern Bengal was accepted by Pope Pius on 28 July 1876. Pope Leo XIII assigned Dufal as the Coadjutor Bishop of Galveston on 14 May 1878. His resignation for reasons of health was accepted by Pope Leo on 6 December 1879.

Dufal retired to the house of his congregation at Neuilly-sur-Seine, near Paris, where he died on 14 March 1898 at the age of 75.

References

External links
Roman Catholic Archdiocese of Galveston–Houston

1822 births
1898 deaths
People from Puy-de-Dôme
Congregation of Holy Cross bishops
19th-century Roman Catholic bishops in the United States
French Roman Catholic bishops in Asia
French Roman Catholic bishops in North America
French Roman Catholic titular bishops
Participants in the First Vatican Council
Roman Catholic bishops of Galveston–Houston
19th-century Roman Catholic bishops in India